Phommalath is a Laotian surname. Notable people with the surname include:

 Singkham Phommalath, Laotian politician
 Sivanxai Phommalath, vegetable vendor who became an activist in Laos

Lao-language surnames